Alberto Martín and Eyal Ran were the defending champions but only Martín competed that year with Paul Rosner.

Martín and Rosner lost in the quarterfinals to Andrei Pavel and Gabriel Trifu.

Aleksandar Kitinov and Johan Landsberg won in the final 6–4, 6–7(5–7), [10–6] against Pablo Albano and Marc-Kevin Goellner.

Seeds

  Tomás Carbonell /  Daniel Orsanic (first round)
  Mariano Hood /  Sebastián Prieto (first round)
  Pablo Albano /  Marc-Kevin Goellner (final)
  Juan Balcells /  Albert Portas (quarterfinals)

Draw

External links
 2001 Gelsor Open Romania Doubles draw

Romanian Open
Doubles
2001 in Romanian tennis